The Wadhwani Institute for Artificial Intelligence—Wadhwani AI—is an applied AI institute that brings artificial intelligence technology to solve social challenges for low-and middle-income citizens. They build and deploy AI solutions in partnership with local governments and civil society organizations to improve large-scale public programs. 

The organization is multidisciplinary, consisting of AI/ML scientists, software engineers, user researchers and designers, domain experts, and solutions managers for problem-solving using AI. At present, it is working on over 15 AI solutions in the agriculture and healthcare domains, in collaboration with partner organizations at the national and state levels in India.

The institute was founded by Romesh Wadhwani and Sunil Wadhwani, and inaugurated in 2018 by Shri Narendra Modi, the 14th Prime Minister of India.

AI for Social Impact
Wadhwani AI’s award-winning AI-powered early pest warning and advisory system equips smallholder cotton farmers with instant advisories, in multiple languages, to enable them to combat infestation using basic Android smartphones. This AI solution aims to address the catastrophic impact of pest attacks on farmer livelihoods in some of the highest cotton-producing states in India.

Wadhwani AI is the official AI partner of the Government of India’s Central Tuberculosis Division (CTD), developing and deploying AI/ML solutions to help the National TB Elimination Program (NTEP) eradicate TB from India by 2025. The institute assists the National Health Authority in leveraging AI/ML technologies to strengthen the Pradhan Mantri Jan Arogya Yojana (PMJAY) and Ayushman Bharat Digital Mission (ABDM) initiatives. It also works closely with the e-Health Division of the Ministry of Health and Family Welfare, the Ministry of Agriculture and Farmers Welfare, and several state governments.

Awards 
 Winner of the Google AI Impact Challenge in 2019.
 Winner of the Fast Company World Changing Ideas Award in 2021.
 Winner of the H&M Foundation Global Change Award in 2022.

References 

Artificial intelligence
Research institutes in Mumbai
Non-profit organisations based in India
Research institutes established in 2018
2018 establishments in Maharashtra